Ardala is a locality situated in Skara Municipality, Västra Götaland County, Sweden with 725 inhabitants in 2010. It was founded in 1890 and used to have a grocery store and a library, but is now only a residential area with mostly villas and one-family-houses.

References 

Populated places in Västra Götaland County
Populated places in Skara Municipality